Avedis Kendir (born 1959, Istanbul, Turkey) is an Armenian jeweler.

Life and career
Of Armenian descent, Avedis Kendir was born to a family of Armenian immigrants from Sivas, Turkey. After discontinuing education at the age of 10, Kendir began learning to make jewelry as an apprentice under an Armenian jewelry master Mateos Usta. In 1980, Kendir founded the "Biriz Jewelry" company and opened his first store in 1983. He has been designing and making jewelry for since then. His style of jewelry is Art Nouveau, Art Deco, and Ottoman stylization. He sells much of his designs at the Kempinski Hotel in Çırağan Palace.

External links
Biriz Jewellery Official Website

References

Turkish jewellers
Turkish people of Armenian descent
Artists from Istanbul
1959 births
Living people
Armenian businesspeople
Armenian jewellers